Pediocactus nigrispinus is a species in the cactus family with the common names snowball cactus, Columbia Plateau cactus, and basalt cactus. It is found in dry areas in Washington, Oregon, and Idaho.

Description
The Columbia Plateau cactus is a densely spiny plant that forms an (often flattened) ovoid up to 30 centimeters in diameter and 15 centimeters tall, sometimes with a single stem but often as a cluster of stems. The showy pink to magenta colored flowers appear in the spring and form a cluster near the apex of each stem. Full technical description at Flora of North America.

Range and habitat
The Columbia Plateau cactus grows in big sagebrush and lower montane dry habitats in eastern Washington and Oregon and extending into Idaho. It grows in scattered locations but is often locally abundant.

References

nigrispinus
Endemic flora of the United States
Flora of the Western United States